Cadwallader Washburn may refer to:

 Cadwallader C. Washburn (1818–1882), American businessman, politician, and soldier
 Cadwallader Lincoln Washburn (1866–1965), American artist and adventurer